The WoodPussy is a 13½’ catboat designed by Philip Rhodes. The first boats were constructed in 1945 by Palmer Scott Boat Works. These boats were wood with wooden masts. The class switched to fiberglass hulls, dacron sails and aluminum masts in the early 1960s. It is estimated that 800-850 hulls were constructed by Palmer Scott, MarScott and O'Day. The Weeks Yacht Yard in New York is now building new fiberglass WoodPussys.

Today there are four fleets of WoodPussies: Monmouth Boat Club (MBC) and Shrewsbury Sailing and Yacht Club (SSYC), both in New Jersey; Crystal Lake Yacht Club, Frankfort, MI; and NorthEast WoodPussy Association, Long Island, NY. The WoodPussy is used for both daysailing and racing. The class, which is recognized by US Sailing as a one-design for racing, holds two major regattas each year: the Solo Bowl, which is limited to single-handed sailing; and the National Championship, which may be sailed either single-handed or with a crew.

For information about the boats, boats for sale, etc., contact the commodores at SSYC and MBC via the links to their home pages shown below and request referral to their WoodPussy fleet captains.

Specifications Under Current Rules

Number of crew 1-2
LOA 
Beam 	
Hull weight 
Mast Height 
Sail Area

Further reading

External links
 Woodpussy boat builder
 Woodpussy Class Association
 Shrewsbury Sailing & Yacht Club
 Monmouth Boat Club

Dinghies
Sailboat types built by O'Day Corp.
Sailboat type designs by Philip Rhodes